The Beloved Bachelor is a 1931 American pre-Code drama film directed by Lloyd Corrigan, and written by Sidney Buchman, Raymond Griffith, Agnes Brand Leahy and Edward Peple. The film stars Paul Lukas, Dorothy Jordan, Vivienne Osborne, Charlie Ruggles, Marjorie Gateson, Harold Minjir and John Breeden. The film was released on October 24, 1931, by Paramount Pictures.

Cast 
Paul Lukas as Michael Morda
Dorothy Jordan as Mitzi Stressman
Vivienne Osborne as Elinor Hunter
Charlie Ruggles as Jerry Wells
Marjorie Gateson as Hortense Cole
Harold Minjir as Winthrop Cole
John Breeden as Jimmy Martin
Leni Stengel as Julie Stressman
Betty Van Allen as  Mitzi Stressman, age 6
Alma Chester as Martha
Guy Oliver as John Adams

References

External links 
 

1931 films
American drama films
1931 drama films
Paramount Pictures films
Films directed by Lloyd Corrigan
Films with screenplays by Sidney Buchman
American black-and-white films
1930s English-language films
1930s American films
English-language drama films